This is the complete list of men's Olympic medalists in fencing.

Current program

Foil, individual

Foil, team

Épée, individual

Épée, team

Sabre, individual

Sabre, team

Discontinued events

Épée, Amateurs and Masters

Épée, Masters

Foil, Masters

Sabre, Masters

Singlestick

All-time medal table - Men's - 1896–2020

See also
Fencing at the 1906 Intercalated Games are no longer regarded as official Games by the International Olympic Committee

References

External links
International Olympic Committee results database

Fencing (men)
Fencing (men)
medalists
Olympic, men